ARCT or Arct may refer to:
An Associate of the Royal Conservatory of Music (Toronto) 
Agence de Régulation et de Contrôle des Télécommunications au Burundi, the Mobile Network Code authority for Burundi 
187th ARCT or Airborne Regimental Combat Team, a name of the 187th Infantry Regiment (United States)

People with the name
Bohdan Arct (1914–1973), Polish fighter pilot
Eugeniusz Arct (1899–1974), Polish painter

See also
ARCT-021, vaccine produced by Arcturus